John Huntar was a Scottish farmer who kept livestock in Holyrood Park for Mary, Queen of Scots.

Huntar was a burgess of the Canongate, a district of Edinburgh which then had a separate administration. He became keeper of Holyrood Park during the regency of Mary of Guise and was paid a fee of £20 Scots. In 1559 and 1560 he built a house in the park, constructed a section of the park dyke, and employed masons and other labourers to repair boundaries, some of which had been destroyed by the villagers of Duddingston.

In 1563 he provided mutton to the royal household and bought and drove 77 cattle to Holyrood Park.

In 1564 he provided meat to the royal household and 24 stones of wool worth £25 to the exchequer. Huntar became the leaseholder of Holyrood Park on 20 March 1565, and was contracted to repair the boundary dykes and drainage ditches around the meadows. The lands included the Abbot's meadow and a marshy area extending extending towards Restalrig. In March 1567 Queen Mary upgraded his terms and he was to make improvements in Holyrood park, including planting broom to feed the sheep.

His wife Margaret Aikman died in 1570.

A valley on Arthur's Seat is called Hunter's Bog. It is unclear if it is named after John Huntar.

James V and the royal flock
Mary's father, James V of Scotland kept sheep in Ettrick Forest. The chronicle writer Robert Lindsay of Pitscottie claimed that Andrew Bell kept a royal flock of 10,000 in that formerly lawless area. Later in the reign, the English ambassador Ralph Sadler tried to encourage James V to close the monasteries and take their revenue so that he would not have to keep sheep like a mean subject. James replied that he had no sheep, he could depend on his god-father the King of France, and it was against reason to close abbeys that "stand these many years, and God's service maintained and kept in the same, and I might have anything I require of them." Sadler knew that James did farm sheep on his estates. After James' death 600 sheep were given to James Douglass of Drumlanrig.

References

Further reading
 John G. Harrison, The Creation and Survival of Some Scots Royal Landscapes: Edinburgh Castle, Holyroodhouse, Linlithgow, Falkland & Stirling (Stirling, 2016), pp. 8–9.

Court of Mary, Queen of Scots
Businesspeople from Edinburgh
16th-century Scottish farmers